Robert Anthony Alleyne (born 27 September 1968) is an English former professional football, who played as a forward. He made over 50 total appearances in the English Football League in the 1980s, playing for Leicester City, Wrexham and Chesterfield.

He also played for Telford United at non-league level.

References

1968 births
Living people
English footballers
Association football forwards
Leicester City F.C. players
Wrexham A.F.C. players
Chesterfield F.C. players
Telford United F.C. players
English Football League players
People from Dudley